The 1956 WANFL season was the 72nd season of senior football in Perth, Western Australia.

Ladder

Grand final

References

West Australian Football League seasons
WANFL